Global Environmental Politics (GEP) is a quarterly peer-reviewed academic journal which examines the relationship between global political forces and environmental change. It covers such topics as the role of states, international finance, science and technology, and grass roots movements. Issues of Global Environmental Politics are divided into three types of articles: short commentaries for a section called Current Debates/Forum, full-length research articles, and book review articles. 

According to the Journal Citation Reports, the journal has a 2019 impact factor of 3.091, ranking it 19th out of 180 journals in the category "Political Science".

Scope
Articles published in Global Environmental Politics include issues concerning certain countries and small groups within those countries, but they must address environmental disputes that are relevant on a global scale. Due to the primary focus of political and policy issues discussed in GEP articles, the range of reader and author backgrounds is presumed and expected. 

The range of submissions focuses on how local-global interactions affect the natural environment, as well as how environmental change affects world politics. The articles published address issues like poverty and inequality, norms and institutions, and economic relationships. The scope of articles also includes specific environmental issues, for example, ozone depletion, climate change, and deforestation. 

GEP also offers an "Early Access" submission option. The Early Access option applies to articles that have been accepted for publication and copyedited, but are not yet finished. These articles are displayed online for durations spanning from weeks to months. They are only to be replaced once the final version is completed and its issue is published. The Early Access option allows the peer review process to begin, increasing the opportunities for feedback and displaying what an uncorrected proof looks like before it is ready for publication. This helps establish the standards for what GEP accepts as an uncorrected proof and expects once it is finalized, while also creating transparency in the editing process that benefits peer reviewers.

Editorial History
The journal was established in 2000 and is published by MIT Press online . The founding editor was Peter Dauvergne. Jennifer Clapp and Matthew Paterson were the co-editors 2007 through 2012, and Kate O'Neill and Stacy VanDever led the journal 2013-2017.  The editors for 2018-2022 are Steven Bernstein, Matthew Hoffmann, and Erika Weinthal.

Current Debates/Forum 
Originally called "Current Debates", the emphasis for this section of the article was shifted when the new editorial team consisting of Jennifer Clapp and Matthew Paterson took over the editorial board. The shorter articles in the Forum section are included in the journal as a means to encourage debate as well as future research. They include new theoretical or historical insights, emerging environmental issues, and discussion of controversial developments in environmental policy. 

Some issues of Global Environmental Politics feature numerous articles discussing a single topic while others contain only one article with the goal of inciting debate on a range of connected issues.  These forum articles comprise short commentaries (2000-3000 words) that prompt discussion on salient issues of interest to other readers and scholars in the field.

Research Articles 
The journal hosts full-length research articles that provide an academic setting for original theoretical or empirical contributions relating to global environmental or comparative politics on a global scale. Research Articles are full-length papers of a maximum of 8000 words, including footnotes and bibliography, that must contain original first-party research. Each journal edition typically consists of four to six articles.

Book Reviews 
Each addition of Global Environmental Politics contains an array of book reviews pertaining to global political forces and environmental changes. The current book review editor is Elizabeth DeSombre. The book review process consists of the editor choosing a number of books per journal edition to which a reviewer may submit a single book review or a review essay. Review essays contain a collective analysis of multiple books on one topic which have been previously outlined by the review editor.

Most cited papers 

Global Environmental Politics maintains a list of top-cited papers which is updated on a monthly basis according to CrossRef’s Database from the past three years. 

These are the currently most cited papers:

Most downloaded papers 
Global Environmental Politics updates a list of their most downloaded papers on a daily basis based on full-text downloads of the last year.

These are the currently most downloaded papers:

Abstracting and indexing 
GEP is indexed in sources including:

 Academic Search
 BIOBASE
 CNKI, China											
 Current Awareness in Biological Sciences
 Current Contents
 EBSCO Discovery
 EconLit
 Environment Index
 Environmental Sciences and Pollution Management
 GEOBASE
 International Political Science Abstracts
 Political Science Complete
 Pollution Abstracts
 ProQuest Summon
 Public Affairs Index
 Scopus
 Social Sciences Citation Index

See also 
 List of political science journals
 MIT Press
 Jstor

References

External links 
 

Environmental social science journals
International relations journals
MIT Press academic journals
Quarterly journals
English-language journals
Publications established in 2000
Political science journals
Globalization-related journals